Mare Tommingas (born 6 November 1959) is an Estonian dancer, choreographer, and director of the ballet company of Vanemuine in Tartu, Estonia.  She is a recipient of The Order of the White Star, 4th Class, 2006.

References

External links 
Profile on Vanemuine website

1959 births
Living people
Estonian choreographers
Ballet choreographers
Estonian female dancers
Recipients of the Order of the White Star, 4th Class